Paleohemilophus dominicanus is an extinct species of beetle in the family Cerambycidae, and the only species in the genus Paleohemilophus. It was described by Martins and Galileo in 1999.

References

Hemilophini
Beetles described in 1999